Xenophobia is the fear of people who are different from one's self.

Xenophobia or Xenophobe may also refer to:
 Xenophobia (Why?), a 1988 rock album
 Xenophobe (video game), a 1987 video game
 Xenophobe (EP), a 2015 metalcore song

See also
 Xenophobe's Guides